USNS Short Splice (T-AK-249) was a US Maritime Administration (MARCOM) C1-M-AV1type coastal cargo ship, originally planned as an . Constructed as Short Splice for MARCOM, completed in August 1945 and placed in operation by the War Shipping Administration during the closing period of World War II. However, the war ended, and she was transferred to the US Army as USAT Short Splice who kept her in service until transferred to the US Navy in 1950.

Construction
Short Splice was laid down under MARCOM contract, MC hull 2464, on 15 January 1945 by Consolidated Steel Corporation, Wilmington, California; launched on 3 March 1945; sponsored by Mrs. A. 0. Wiese; and delivered to the United States Steamship Lines on 18 May 1945.

US Army service
She was acquired and operated by the Army which commissioned her on 17 July 1946, as USAT Short Spice. She was retained by the Army until she was transferred to the US Navy 1 March 1950.

US Navy service
She operated with the Military Sea Transportation Service (MSTS), carrying cargo for military bases. Until 5 March 1959, she called at almost every European port as well as ports along the Atlantic western coast from Goose Bay, Labrador, to the Panama Canal Zone. She then operated from New Orleans, Louisiana, carrying supplies, ammunition, and vehicles to Panama; Key West, Florida; San Juan, Puerto Rico; and Kingston, Jamaica.

On 3 November 1966, Short Splice moved to the Far East, and a crew of Koreans was assigned to man her. She made supply runs to Vietnam, Korea, Japan, and the Philippine Islands. On 30 March 1973, the Korean crew was replaced by American merchant seamen, but her area of operations did not change.

Final inactivation
On 20 June 1973, while at Sasebo, Japan, she was transferred to the Maritime Administration (MARAD) for disposal. Short Splice was sold to Fuji Marden & Co. Ltd., Hong Kong, British Crown Colony, on 31 July 1973 and scrapped.

Notes 

Citations

Bibliography 

Online resources

External links

 

Type C1-M ships
Ships built in Los Angeles
1945 ships
Merchant ships of the United States
Type C1-M ships of the United States Army
Korean War auxiliary ships of the United States
Vietnam War auxiliary ships of the United States
Alamosa-class cargo ships